The Black Mountain rainbow-skink (Liburnascincus scirtetis) is an endemic species that inhabits a total of  on Kalkajaka in Queensland, Australia. The species is 70 mm long with a weight between 4 and 6 grams.

References

Liburnascincus
Skinks of Australia
Reptiles described in 1980
Taxa named by Glen Joseph Ingram
Taxa named by Jeanette Covacevich